HJ-Story is an autobiographical webcomic illustrated by Andrew Hou. The comic strip centers mainly around two characters based on he and his wife. Although fans may feel they are following the artist’s love story with his wife, the illustrations mostly stand independently with no continuity between strips. Unlike traditional comic strips, verbal dialogue between the two characters is rare, and emoticons are used to convey emotions and suggest communication.

The Illustrator 
Andrew Hou is a Canadian-born Chinese illustrator married to Kate (a.k.a. HJ) who is Korean. The pair tied the knot in 2011 and now live together in Toronto, Ontario, Canada. Andrew began his career as a freelance illustrator in the game industry, and he graduated in classical animation.

Origins of HJ-Story 
The comic is named after the initials of Kate's Korean name. The comic started in 2011 as a series of rough sketches, sent through SMS by Andrew Hou to his  girlfriend (now wife), Kate, as an attempt to bridge the communication barrier between them, as he was not fluent in Korean at the time. At that time, Andrew admitted that he does not express well with words on his love towards her but began to draw instead.

Andrew proceeded to compile all the art on Tumblr so he could share it with her as a gift. He also shared it with a few friends. One of those friends shared it on Twitter, where it went viral.

Andrew self-published HJ-Story through funds raised via Kickstarter. His book is into its 3rd installment as of 2015. In Malaysia, a local comic book publisher named Keropok Comics got the rights to publish HJ-Story's books and it became an instant best-seller in that country.

In January 2015, Andrew was able to quit his full-time job to focus on HJ-Story full-time. He feels blessed and grateful and states that his main inspiration is his wife.

Platforms 
HJ-Story is distributed via several platforms. Though most platforms share the same content. Platforms like Patreon publish exclusive content or previews as a source of revenue to the artist.

Book and Products 
 Books
 Self Published Origins, Vol 1, Vol 2, Vol 3
 Vol 1 published in Malaysia by Keropok Comics in 2015
 Merchandise (via HJ-Story Online Store)
 Magnets 
 Badge
 Lanyards
 Stickers
 Postcards
 Prints
 Pocket Mirror, and many more
Digital
Line stickers (https://store.line.me/stickershop/author/74527/en)
 Various stickers on platforms such as Between, BBM, Jorte and many more
 HJ-Story E-books Vol 1, 2 and 3

References

External links 
 HJ-Story official website

2011 webcomic debuts
Autobiographical webcomics
Romance webcomics
Canadian webcomics